The 1929–30 Football League season was Birmingham Football Club's 34th in the Football League and their 17th in the First Division. They finished in 11th position in the 22-team division. They also competed in the 1929–30 FA Cup, entering at the third round proper and losing to Arsenal in the fourth after a replay.

Twenty-five players made at least one appearance in nationally organised competition, and there were thirteen different goalscorers. Forwards Johnny Crosbie and George Hicks played in 42 of the 45 matches over the season, and Joe Bradford was leading scorer for the ninth successive year, with 23 goals, all scored in the league.

Off the field, the Yorkshire Post reported that "The annual statement of accounts of the Birmingham F.C. shows a profit on last season's working of £1,412, a pleasant change from the previous season, when the club declared a loss of nearly £7,300. Gross receipts show a considerable increase, totalling nearly £40,000, the attendances being better throughout the season."

Football League First Division

League table (part)

FA Cup

Appearances and goals

Players with name struck through and marked  left the club during the playing season.

See also
Birmingham City F.C. seasons

References
General
 Matthews, Tony (1995). Birmingham City: A Complete Record. Breedon Books (Derby). .
 Matthews, Tony (2010). Birmingham City: The Complete Record. DB Publishing (Derby). .
 Source for match dates and results: "Birmingham City 1929–1930: Results". Statto Organisation. Retrieved 12 May 2012.
 Source for lineups, appearances, goalscorers and attendances: Matthews (2010), Complete Record: pp. 300–01.
 Source for kit: "Birmingham City". Historical Football Kits. Retrieved 22 May 2018.

Specific

Birmingham City F.C. seasons
Birmingham